Ai Cheng (born 15 February 1987), known professionally as Gloria Ai, is a Chinese bilingual business anchorwoman. She is the founder of iAsk Media, Venture Partner at SAIF Partners. Started her own business, iAsk Media, since 2014, focus on shows interviewing people made great contributions to the world. She was awarded as Global Shapers from World Economic Forum and Forbes 30 Under 30 Asia from Forbes.

Early life 
Ai was born in Huangshan, Anhui province in 1987.  She then went on to Beijing, and later Boston to study. Upon graduation from Harvard, she became a New York-based business commentator for China Central Television before returning to China and founded iAsk Media.

Career 
Prior to Ai's entrepreneurial ventures, she was a business commentator at China Central Television Business Channel in New York and an Investment Policy Consultant at the International Finance Corporation in Washington D.C.

Ai started her own company iAsk Media in 2014 as founder and host. In 2016, Ai joined SAIF Partners in 2016 as Venture Partner.

Education 
Ai graduated from the Harvard Kennedy School with a master's degree in Business and Government Policy, during which she served as the President of Media Group at Harvard Kennedy School. She previously obtained a master's degree in International Communications from Peking University, during which she served as the President of Nanyan Radio Station of Peking University Graduate School. Ai earned her BA degree from Communication University of China, during which she served as Chief Editor of University Newspaper of Communication University of China.

Charity 
Ai is committed to support children and youth for a better life. She co-hosts the first nationally broadcast weekly program that raises funds for China's poorest children who live in over 100,000 villages below poverty line. She hosts another top nationally broadcast reality show You're Hired! which helps tens of millions of new graduates get their jobs.. She also founded the iAsk Red Charity. The charity hosted event in 2016 which gathered over 200 business leaders to support campaigns for a wide range of social NGOs, such as WABC for autistic children, SOS Children's Villages China for orphans and so on.

Books 
 How Not Letting Your Company Die For Startups (Chinese) published by CITIC Press in 2017.
 Common Sense of Entrepreneurship (Chinese) published by CITIC Press in 2016.
 Struggle is a Faith (Chinese) published by China Friendship Press in 2015.

Honours and awards 
 2016, Forbes 30 Under 30 Asia by Forbes.
 The Global Shapers by World Economic Forum.
 2021, National Woman Pace-Setter.

References 

 Profile about Gloria Ai on Boao Forum website.
 Profile about Gloria Ai on Global Shapers website
 Profile about Gloria Ai on Bloomberg website
 Profile about Gloria Ai on WISE Summit website
 TEDx Talks: In pursuit of completeness | Gloria Ai

Female broadcasters
Living people
1987 births
Chinese broadcasters
People from Huangshan
Harvard Kennedy School alumni
Peking University alumni
Communication University of China alumni